Sharbat may refer to:

 Sharbat (beverage), a Middle Eastern variety of cordial
 Sharbat Ali Changezi, Pakistani fighter pilot
 Sharbat Gula, the subject of the Afghan Girl cover photograph on the front cover of  National Geographic magazine's June 1985 issue
 Sharbat Khan, a detainee at Guantanamo Bay

See also
 Sherbet (disambiguation)
 Sherbert (disambiguation)
 Sorbet